Mariusz Konrad Musial (born 1 January 1978) is a Norwegian bobsledder and athlete.

He was born in Jelenia Góra, Poland. In his early career he was a track and field athlete, with lifetime bests such as 4.40 metres in the pole vault, 6.90 metres in the long jump and 10.85 seconds in the 100 metres. He represented the club IL i BUL.

He competed at the 2002 Winter Olympics in Salt Lake City, in men's four, together with Arnfinn Kristiansen, Ole Christian Strømberg and Bjarne Røyland.

References

External links

1978 births
Living people
People from Jelenia Góra
Polish emigrants to Norway
Norwegian male sprinters
Norwegian male bobsledders
Bobsledders at the 2002 Winter Olympics
Olympic bobsledders of Norway